The Effect of Gamma Rays on Man-in-the-Moon Marigolds is a play written by Paul Zindel, a playwright and science teacher. Zindel received the 1971 Pulitzer Prize for Drama and a New York Drama Critics' Circle Award for the work.

Productions
The play's world premiere happened in the 1964/1965 season at the Alley Theatre in Houston.

The play premiered Off-Broadway at the Mercer Arts Center on April 7, 1970, and closed on May 14, 1972, after 819 performances. Directed by Melvin Bernhardt, the cast featured Swoosie Kurtz (Janice Vickery), Amy Levitt (Ruth), Judith Lowry (Nanny), Pamela Payton-Wright (Tillie), and Sada Thompson (Beatrice).

A touring production produced by Theatre Now and directed by Leland Ball, starring Teresa Wright (Beatrice), Alexandra Stoddart (Tillie), Robin Nolan (Ruth), Helen Ross (Nanny), and Carol Potter (Janice Vickery), toured from October 13, 1972, until February 8, 1973.

The play was presented on Broadway at the Biltmore Theatre, from March 9, 1978 (previews) to March 26, 1978. Directed by A. J. Antoon, the cast included Shelley Winters (Beatrice), Carol Kane (Tillie), Lolly Boroff (Janice Vickery), Isabella Hoopes (Nanny), and Lori Shelle (Ruth).

The Oregon Shakespeare Festival also produced the play in 1978 at its intimate Black Swan theater, directed by William Glover.

It was adapted for the screen in 1972, directed by Paul Newman and starring his wife Joanne Woodward, daughter Nell Potts, and Roberta Wallach, daughter of Eli Wallach. Woodward won the award for Best Actress at the 1973 Cannes Film Festival.

Plot
The play revolves around a dysfunctional family consisting of single mother Beatrice and her two daughters, Ruth and Tillie, who try to cope with their abysmal status in life. The play is a lyrical drama, reminiscent of Tennessee Williams' style.

Shy Matilda Hunsdorfer, nicknamed Tillie, prepares an experiment involving marigolds raised from seeds exposed to radioactivity for her science fair. She is, however, constantly thwarted by her mother Beatrice, who is self-centered and abusive, and by her extroverted and unstable sister Ruth, who submits to her mother's will. Over the course of the play, Beatrice constantly tries to stamp out any opportunities Tillie has of succeeding, due to her own lack of success in life. As the play progresses, the paths of the three characters diverge: Ruth has a nervous collapse while attempting to stand up to Beatrice, who, driven to the verge of insanity by her deep-seated enmity, impulsively kills the girls' pet rabbit Peter and wallows in her own perceived insignificance. Tillie meanwhile (much like her project's deformed yet beautiful, hardy marigolds) wins the science fair through sheer perseverance.

Characters
 Matilda "Tillie" Hunsdorfer The main protagonist of the play. A quiet and introverted character who is teased at school. She copes with her life by immersing herself in science, hoping to reach a philosophical epiphany. Her untiring quest for her individuality stands in open defiance of her mother's wish for total control over the family. Consequently, she receives the brunt of the abuse. Tillie also owns a rabbit named Peter, given to her by her science teacher, Mr. Goodman.

 Ruth Hunsdorfer Tillie's older sister. A brash but confused adolescent, she looks to others for advice, but often gains this insight from Beatrice. Although abused as well, she often bends to her mother's will, gaining her favor and sheltering her from the full extent of her mother's abuse. On many occasions, she engages in attempts at gaslighting Tillie as the crazy one, even though she herself actually underwent psychiatric treatment, and is implied to have epilepsy. She also takes a liking to Tillie's pet rabbit, to the point where she blackmails Tillie for possession of the rabbit by threatening to tell their mother what the adults at the school call her—"Betty the Loon."

 Beatrice Hunsdorfer Tillie's and Ruth's mother. A single mother whose life has gone awry, she copes with it through self-loathing, cynicism, and drug abuse, and by verbally (and at times physically) abusing her two daughters. As the play's main antagonist, Beatrice is mainly narcissistic, domineering, and lethally short-tempered, which is only worsened by the drugs. However, her plight is sympathetic, as her past reveals a life spiraling steadily downward from serendipitous circumstances, leading her to self-destruction.  Memorable actresses who played the leading role include Eileen Heckart, Sada Thompson, Shelley Winters, Helena Carroll, Joan Blondell and Joanne Woodward.

 Mr. Goodman Tillie's science teacher. He serves as a mentor to Tillie. Mr. Goodman is mentioned on many occasions, but never seen, although the dialogue often implies that he is the only positive role model in Tillie's life.

 Nanny An elderly boarder in the Hunsdorfer household. Silent throughout, she does not contribute much beyond being yet another burden to the already stressed-out Beatrice who verbally abuses her as she does her daughters. Veteran actress Judith Lowry played "Nanny" in nearly every production of the play, including TV, Off-Broadway and the movie. During the off-Broadway run, even though her character never spoke any lines in the play, she became a popular guest on The Tonight Show with Johnny Carson, which led to late stardom as a series regular on Phyllis with Cloris Leachman.

 Mr Frank Beatrice's father. A deceased vegetable vendor. After his wife (Beatrice's mother) died, he raised Beatrice on his own. Although he had a lowly status, Beatrice holds him in high regard—"He makes up for all the men in the world"—and smiles imagining her daughters meeting him.

 Janice Vickery Tillie's rival at the science fair. Her experiment involved boiling the skin off a dead cat so she may use its skeleton. She plans to use a dog in her next science fair project.

Film adaptation

Paul Newman produced and directed a film adaptation of the play from a screenplay by Alvin Sargent. Newman cast his wife, Joanne Woodward, and one of their daughters, Nell Potts, in two of the lead roles.

Awards and nominations
The play won the Pulitzer Prize for Drama for 1971.

Winners

 1970 Drama Critics' Circle Award, Best American Play, Paul Zindel 
 1970 Clarence Derwent Award, Pamela Payton-Wright 
 1970 Obie Award
 Distinguished Direction, Melvin Bernhardt
 Distinguished Performance, Pamela Payton-Wright
 Best American Play, Paul Zindel
 Best Performance, Sada Thompson

References

External links
Paul Zindel's official website
 
 
 

1964 plays
Broadway plays
Plays by Paul Zindel
Pulitzer Prize for Drama-winning works
Plays set in the United States
American plays adapted into films